is a Japanese manga series written and illustrated by Ken Wakui. It was serialized in Kodansha's Weekly Young Magazine from 2005 to 2013, with its chapters collected in thirty-eight tankōbon volumes. It was adapted into a Japanese television drama series that aired in 2007 and was also adapted into two live-action films directed by Sion Sono.

Tatsuhiko Shitori
Chisato Morinaga
Mako
Hideyoshi
Yousuke
Seki
Hayama
Tokimasa
Tadatoshi Ushio
Soga
Kameyama
Momozuka Yuu
Saotome Akemi
Masaki Taki
Tanashi Take

TV series

Cast
Yōsuke Kawamura as Tatsuhiko
Haruna Yabuki as Yūka Hasegawa
Tomohisa Yuge as Hideyoshi Minami
Eiki Kitamura as Mako

Film adaptations

Shinjuku Swan

The manga was adapted into a comedy film directed by Sion Sono that was released in Japan on May 30, 2015.

Shinjuku Swan II

Shinjuku Swan II, also directed by Sion Sono, was released in Japan on January 21, 2017.

Images

References

External links
Film official website 

Kodansha manga
Seinen manga
TV Asahi original programming
2007 Japanese television series debuts
2007 Japanese television series endings
Japanese television dramas based on manga
Shinjuku
Manga adapted into films